Greg Johnson (born c. 1960) is a former American football coach. He served as the head football coach at Langston University from 1991 to 1996 at and Prairie View A&M University from 1997 to 1998, compiling a career college record of 36–49.

On January 31, 2012 it was announced that Johnson has been hired by Texas Southern to be the associate head coach, co-defensive coordinator, and cornerbacks coach.

Coaching career
Johnson was the 19th head football coach at Prairie View A&M University in Prairie View, Texas and he held that position for two seasons, from 1997 until 1998.  His record at Prairie View was 1–19.

Johnson lost the first 12 games of his career—part of an 80-game losing streak over parts of 10 seasons, the longest in NCAA history. However, it was in the fourth game of his second season as head coach when the streak was broken by a 14–12 victory over Langston. Tensions over the losing streak had grown so high at the school that the entire marching band was suspended by the conference the week before as a result of fighting between marching bands.

Head coaching record

References

Year of birth missing (living people)
Living people
Langston Lions football coaches
Northwestern Oklahoma State Rangers football players
Oklahoma Panhandle State Aggies football coaches
Prairie View A&M Panthers football coaches
Tennessee Tech Golden Eagles football coaches
Texas Southern Tigers football coaches
Northwestern Oklahoma State University alumni
African-American coaches of American football
African-American players of American football
20th-century African-American sportspeople
21st-century African-American sportspeople